1978 in the Philippines details events of note that happened in the Philippines in the year 1978.

Incumbents

 President: Ferdinand Marcos (KBL)
 Prime Minister: Ferdinand Marcos  (KBL) (post established on June 12)
House Speaker:
Vacant (until June 12)
Querube Makalintal (starting June 12)
 Chief Justice: Fred Ruiz Castro

Events

January
 January 3 – Eleven worshipers die when fire broke out in a Buddhist temple in Manila.

April
 April 7 – General elections are held for the election of the 166 (out of 208) regional representatives to the Interim Batasang Pambansa (the nation's first parliament). The elections are contested by the leading opposition party, the Lakas ng Bayan (LABAN) which had twenty-one candidates for the Metro Manila area and the leading candidate is the jailed opposition leader Ninoy Aquino while the regime's party known as the Kilusang Bagong Lipunan (KBL) which is led by the then First Lady Imelda Marcos.
 April 27 – Parliamentary sectoral elections for the election of the Interim Batasang Pambansa sectoral representatives is held.

July
 July 9 – At least 11 persons are killed and 110 injured when fire broke out in a theater complex in Manila.

August
 August 25 – Tropical Storms severely battered the northern Philippines and Manila, killing more than 50 persons.

September
 September 14 – A Philippine Air Force plane, carrying members of President Ferdinand E. Marcos' security staff and journalists, crash in Manila while trying to land in a thunderstorm. At least 32 persons are killed.

October
 October 27 – Typhoon Rita pummels Manila with winds up to 94 miles per hour (150 kilometers per hour). At least 20 are killed and 70,000 left homeless in the floods that resulted.

November
 November 21 – Batas Pambansa Bilang 7 establishes Aurora, then a sub-province and an administrative area in Quezon, as an independent province; it would be ratified in a plebiscite in May 1979.

Holidays

As per Act No. 2711 section 29, issued on March 10, 1917, any legal holiday of fixed date falls on Sunday, the next succeeding day shall be observed as legal holiday. Sundays are also considered legal religious holidays. Bonifacio Day was added through Philippine Legislature Act No. 2946. It was signed by then-Governor General Francis Burton Harrison in 1921. On October 28, 1931, the Act No. 3827 was approved declaring the last Sunday of August as National Heroes Day. As per Republic Act No. 3022, April 9 was proclaimed as Bataan Day. Independence Day was changed from July 4 (Philippine Republic Day) to June 12 (Philippine Independence Day) on August 4, 1964.

 January 1 – New Year's Day
 February 22 – Legal Holiday
 March 24 – Maundy Thursday
 March 25 – Good Friday
 April 9 – Bataan Day
 May 1 – Labor Day
 June 12 – Independence Day 
 July 4 – Philippine Republic Day
 August 13  – Legal Holiday
 August 27 – National Heroes Day
 September 21 – Thanksgiving Day
 November 30 – Bonifacio Day
 December 25 – Christmas Day
 December 30 – Rizal Day

Entertainment and culture

Premieres
The PBA on GTV (sports program)

Sports
 October 1–14 – The 1978 FIBA World Championship is hosted by Philippines. Rizal Memorial Coliseum at Manila and Araneta Coliseum at Quezon City, Metro Manila were the venues for the event. The Philippines ranked seventh place in the event.
 December 9–20 – The Philippines participated in the 1978 Asian Games held in Bangkok, Thailand. It ranked ninth with 4 gold medals, 4 silver medals and 6 bronze medals with a total of 14 over-all medals.

Births

January 4 – Lino Cayetano, politician and television director
January 25 – Nyoy Volante, singer
January 31 – Jessa Zaragoza, actress and singer
February 3 – Miko Palanca, actor (d. 2019)
February 8 – Francis Pasion, film and television director (d. 2016)
March 1 – Brandon Cablay, basketball player
March 6 – Archie Alemania, actor, host, and comedian
March 18 – Juris Fernandez, singer-songwriter
March 21 – Joyce Jimenez, actress
March 26 – Gian Sotto, actor and politician
April 17 – Jaypee de Guzman, actor
April 21 – Cindy Kurleto, Austrian model and actress
May 11 – Judy Ann Santos, television and film actress
May 31 – Sara Duterte, politician
June 8 – Mr. Fu, radio and television personality
June 10 – Ricky Calimag, basketball player
June 14 – G. Toengi, actress
June 17 – KC Montero, host, radio and television presenter 
July 1 – Precious Hipolito, politician
July 13 – Gary David, basketball player
July 14 – Karl Kendrick Chua, economist and acting secretary of National Economic and Development Authority
July 22 – Ryan Eigenmann, actor
August 12 – Jan Marini, singer, actress, blogger and former Teen idol of Ang TV
August 14 – Mark Villar, businessman and Secretary of Public Works and Highways
August 24 – Tony dela Cruz, basketball player
September 8 – Regine Tolentino, TV host, actress, and businesswoman
September 17 – Jennifer Rosales, golfer
October 22 - Lindsay Custodio, actress and singer.
November 6 – Jolina Magdangal, television film actress, singer, TV personality and former Teen idol.
November 26 – Jamir Garcia, frontman of Slapshock (d. 2020)
November 27 – Gem Ramos, actress
December 8 – Pia Arcangel, television journalist
December 10 – Jon Arigo, basketball player
December 17 – Manny Pacquiao, boxer and politician

References